
Year 337 (CCCXXXVII) was a common year starting on Saturday (link will display the full calendar) of the Julian calendar. At the time, it was known as the Year of the Consulship of Felicianus and Titianus (or, less frequently, year 1090 Ab urbe condita). The denomination 337 for this year has been used since the early medieval period, when the Anno Domini calendar era became the prevalent method in Europe for naming years.

Events 
 By place 

 Roman Empire 
 May 22 – Constantine the Great, first Christian Roman emperor of the Western Empire (312–324), and of the Roman Empire (324–337), dies in Achyron, near Nicomedia, at age 65, after he is baptized by Eusebius of Nicomedia.
 September – A number of descendants of Constantius Chlorus, and officials of the Roman Empire, are executed for a purge against the sons of Constantine I.
 September 9 – Constantine II, Constantius II, and Constans succeed their father Constantine I as co-emperors. The Roman Empire is divided between the three Augusti (see map).

 Persia 
 King Shapur II of Persia begins a war against the Roman Empire. He sends his troops across the Tigris to recover Armenia and Mesopotamia.
 Shapur II besieges the Roman fortress of Nisibis (Syria), but is repulsed by forces under Lucilianus.

 China 
 Murong Huang claims the title of Prince of Yan, effectively beginning the kingdom of Former Yan.

 By topic 

 Religion 
 February 6 – A 4-month papal vacancy ends; Pope Julius I succeeds Pope Mark, as the 35th pope.
 June 17 – Constantius II announces the restoration of Athanasius, as Patriarch of Alexandria.
 Paul I becomes Patriarch of Constantinople.
 Christianity is declared an official religion in Caucasian Iberia, marking the rise of Christianity in Georgia.

Births 
 Faxian, Chinese Buddhist monk, traveler (approximate date)
 Fú Jiān, emperor of the Chinese Di state Former Qin (d. 385)
 Lü Guang, founding emperor of the Di state Later Liang (d. 400)
 Zenobius of Florence, Italian bishop and wonderworker (d. 417)

Deaths 

 January 13 – Leontius of Caesarea, Roman Catholic bishop and saint
 February 21 – Eustathius the Great, patriarch of Antioch (approximate date)
 May 22 – Constantine the Great, emperor of the Roman Empire, Orthodox priest and saint  (b. 272)
 May 27 – Flavius Dalmatius, father of Dalmatius and Hannibalianus (executed)
 August 30 – Alexander of Constantinople, bishop of Byzantium (approximate date)
 September 11 – Julius Constantius, son of Constantius Chlorus (executed)
 September 24 – Hannibalianus, king of the Pontus and nephew of Constantine I (executed)
 September 27 – Dalmatius, Caesar and nephew of Constantine I (executed)

References